This article lists described species of the family Asilidae start with letter I.

A
B
C
D
E
F
G
H
I
J
K
L
M
N
O
P
Q
R
S
T
U
V
W
Y
Z

List of Species

Genus Ichneumolaphria
 Ichneumolaphria fascipennis (Hermann, 1912)
 Ichneumolaphria schachti (Geller-Grimm, 1997)
 Ichneumolaphria zikani (Carrera, 1951)

Genus Illudium
 Illudium hibernum (Richter, 1962)

Genus Iranopogon
 Iranopogon brandti (Timon-David, 1955)
 Iranopogon gaspari (Tomasovic, 1999)

Genus Irwinomyia
 Irwinomyia argentea (Londt, 1994)
 Irwinomyia aurea (Londt, 1994)

Genus Ischiolobos
 Ischiolobos mesotopos (Londt, 2005)
 Ischiolobos notios (Londt, 2005)

Genus Itolia
 Itolia atripes (Wilcox, 1949)
 Itolia fascia (Martin, 1966)
 Itolia maculata (Wilcox, 1936)
 Itolia pilosa (Martin, 1966)
 Itolia timberlakei (Wilcox, 1949)

References 

 
Asilidae